Pterostylis pulchella, commonly known as the waterfall greenhood, escarpment greenhood or pretty greenhood is a species of orchid endemic to New South Wales. As with similar greenhoods, the flowering plants differ from those that are not flowering. The non-flowering plants have a rosette of leaves flat on the ground but the flowering plants have a single flower with leaves on the flowering stem. This greenhood has a reddish-brown flower with a greenish-white base and protruding labellum with a cleft tip.

Description
Pterostylis pulchella is a terrestrial, perennial, deciduous, herb with an underground tuber and when not flowering, a rosette of between three and five egg-shaped leaves lying flat on the ground. The flowers are greenish-white near the base, reddish-brown above. Flowering occurs from February to May.

Taxonomy and naming
Pterostylis pulchella was first formally described in 1933 by Pearl Messmer from a specimen collected near Fitzroy Falls. The description was published in Proceedings of the Linnean Society of New South Wales. The specific epithet (pulchella) is the diminutive form of the Latin word pulcher meaning "pretty", hence "pretty little".

Distribution and habitat
The waterfall greenhood grows on cliffs near waterfalls, on moist, sheltered ridges and on mossy rocks near creeks. It is found in only five locations on the Illawarra escarpment and Southern Highlands.

Conservation
Pterostylis pulchella is listed as  "vulnerable" under the Australian Government Environment Protection and Biodiversity Conservation Act 1999 and the New South Wales Threatened Species Protection Act 1995. The main threat to the species is illegal collecting.

References

pulchella
Endemic orchids of Australia
Orchids of New South Wales
Plants described in 1933